Knut Jönsson Posse (Finnish: Nuutti Posse) was a Swedish general in Sweden and Finland remembered for the Viipuri Blast (1495)  and for his surprise attack on the Danish Army at the Battle of Brunkeberg (1471).

Military career 
Knut Posse  was appointed bailiff of Stockholm Castle in 1466 and in 1472  was bailiff at   Hämeenlinna Castle. In 1490 he was appointed courtier at Kastelholm Castle and in 1495  Posse was governor of Viipuri castle.  He lived until 1500 and died at Kastelholm Castle. He  was buried at Turku Cathedral.

Battle of Brunkeberg 

In 1471, Regent Sten Sture ordered Posse to load the garrison of  Stockholm Castle onto boats to ready a surprise attack on the Danish and German Army of King Christian I of Denmark. His order were to attack the Danes in the rear from Stadsholmen, . The Danes would then be attacked on three sides: Sten Sture would attack from the south, Nils Sture would flank the Danes and attack from the rear, and Posse would attack the Danes from the east flank. The Danish were completely surprised by Posse's attack. Soon after the battle started, Christian I sent more troops to reinforce their 
position near Sankta Klara kloster. The Danish Armies were no match for Posse's men, whom he led from the front. Posse's legs were hit by several Danish arrows.

Vyborg Bang 
From 1495 to 1497, Posse was governor of Vyborg Castle, and commanded the garrison during the 1495 siege by forces of the Grand Duchy of Moscow. He successfully defeated the much larger Russian army by luring the attackers onto the walls and detonating an explosive mine under their feet, in what became known as 'the Vyborg Bang'.

References 

15th-century Swedish people
Swedish generals
1500 deaths
Year of birth unknown
15th-century Finnish people